This is a list of governors of Greenland. The position was established, after the positions of inspectors of Greenland was abolished. In 1950, the two governors were collected into the Governor of all of Greenland. The position was abolished in 1979, following Greenland's gain of home rule.

List of officeholders

Superindent of Greenland (1728–1730)

 Poul Hansen Egede (1730-1789)

Governor of North Greenland (1925–1950)

Governor of South Greenland (1925–1950)

Governor of Greenland (1950–1979)

See also
 List of inspectors of Greenland, for colonial administrators before 1924
 Prime Minister of Greenland, for administrators after the institution of Home Rule in 1979
 List of Danish High Commissioners in Greenland

References

Greenland

Governors of Greenland